Kossovo may refer to:

Kosovo
Kosava, Belarus